Nemtsov (Nemcóv) is a surname of Russian origin. People with this surname include:

 Boris Nemtsov (1959–2015), assassinated Russian scientist and politician
 Grigorijs Ņemcovs (1948–2010), Latvian journalist
 Sarah Nemtsov (born 1980), German composer

Russian-language surnames